Beijing Blues is a 2012 Chinese film directed by Gao Qunshu. It won Best Feature Film, Best Cinematography, and Best Film Editing at the Golden Horse Film Festival and Awards in 2012.

References

External links
 

2012 films
2010s Mandarin-language films
Chinese drama films
Films directed by Gao Qunshu